Jennifer Mathieu is an American author of young adult fiction. Her 2017 novel Moxie was adapted into a film of the same name.

Mathieu grew up on the East Coast of the United States and now lives in Texas with her family. She originally worked as a journalist and is currently an English teacher and writer of young adult novels.

Publications 

Novels:
 The Truth About Alice (2014)
 Devoted (2015)
 Afterward (2016)
 Moxie (2017)
 The Liars of Mariposa Island (2019)
 Bad Girls Never Say Die (2021)
 Down Came the Rain (expected 2023)

Short stories:
 "Dynamite Junior" in Fierce Reads: Kisses and Curses, edited by Lauren Burniac (2015)

Awards and honors 
Moxie and The Truth About Alice are Junior Library Guild books.

References 

Living people
21st-century American writers
21st-century American women writers
Writers from Texas
Year of birth missing (living people)